David Minton (born 21 July 1984) is an English professional wrestler. He is most known for his time in WWE, where he performed on its NXT UK brand under the ring name "Bomber" Dave Mastiff.

Professional wrestling career

Total Nonstop Action Wrestling (2014–2015) 
Mastiff appeared for Total Nonstop Action Wrestling (TNA) in 2014 on the second season of TNA British Boot Camp. Mastiff first match on the show was aired on 9 November, when he defeated Rampage Brown. In his second match of the show, which aired on 30 November, Mastiff was once again victorious in an eight-person tag team match alongside Brown, Angelina Love and Noam Dar where they defeated Al Snow, Grado, Kay Lee Ray and Mark Andrews. Mastiff advanced to the final six, but the competition was eventually won by Andrews.

Through January 2015, Mastiff worked couple matches on Xplosion, where he lost to Mandrews (formerly known as Mark Andrews) and Samoa Joe.

World of Sport Wrestling (2016) 
On 11 November 2016, Mastiff defeated Grado to win the inaugural WOS Championship, however, Mastiff lost the championship to Grado on the same episode.

WWE

NXT UK (2018–2022) 
Mastiff made his WWE debut on 9 June 2018, when he participated in the United Kingdom Championship Tournament. Mastiff advanced from the first round after defeating Kenny Williams, however, was eliminated in the quarter-finals by Joe Coffey. Mastiff made his NXT UK debut on the first episode of the show which aired on 17 October, when he defeated Sid Scala.

Mastiff, who was yet to be defeated on NXT UK, fought Eddie Dennis to a double disqualification on the 2 January 2019 episode of the show. This led to a No Disqualification match on NXT UK TakeOver: Blackpool, on 12 January, which Mastiff won.

On the 5 June episode of NXT UK, Mastiff competed in a Fatal four-way match against Joe Coffey, Jordan Devlin and Travis Banks to determine the #1 contender for the WWE United Kingdom Championship. Banks won the match, as Mastiff suffered his first loss on the show. After Coffey and Mastiff wrestled to a double countout on the 7 August episode of NXT UK, both faced in a Last Man Standing match on NXT UK TakeOver: Cardiff, on 31 August, when Mastiff was defeated.

On the 30 January 2020 episode of NXT UK, Mastiff lost a six-man tag team match with Mark Andrews and Flash Morgan Webster, against Imperium's Marcel Barthel, Fabian Aichner and Alexander Wolfe. On the February 13 episode of NXT UK, Mastiff defeated Saxon Huxley.

On August 18th 2022, Mastiff was released from his WWE contract.

Personal life 
On 17 October 2020, Minton announced his marriage.

Championships and accomplishments 
 Anti-Watershed Wrestling
 AWW Heavyweight Championship (1 times)
 Athletik Club Wrestling
 ACW World Wrestling Championship (1 time)
 Attack! Pro Wrestling
 Attack! 24:7 Championship (1 time)
 Be. Catch Company
 BCC Championship (1 time)
 BCC Championship Tournament (2010)
 Big League Wrestling
 BLW Tag Team Championship (1 time) – with Big Grizzly
 Fight Club: Pro
 FCP Championship (1 time)
 International Pro Wrestling: United Kingdom
 IPW:UK World Championship (1 time)
 Power of Wrestling
 POW Tag Team Championship (1 time) – with Douglas Williams
 Preston City Wrestling
 PCW Heavyweight Championship (1 time)
 Pro Wrestling Elite
PWE Heavyweight Championship (1 time)
 Pro Wrestling Illustrated
 Ranked No. 307 of the top 500 singles wrestlers in the PWI 500 in 2019
 Real Quality Wrestling
 RQW Tag Team Championship (1 time) – with Jack Storm
 RQW Tag Team Championship Tournament (2007) – with Jack Storm
 Vertigo Pro Wrestling
 VPW Heavyweight Championship (1 time)
 VPW Heavyweight Championship Tournament (2015)
 World of Sport Wrestling
 WOS Championship (1 time)

References

External links 

Living people
Sportspeople from Dudley
English male professional wrestlers
1984 births
Undisputed British Heavyweight Champions